Amphidromus atricallosus is a species of air-breathing, arboreal land snail, a terrestrial pulmonate gastropod mollusk in the family Camaenidae.

Subspecies 
 Amphidromus atricallosus atricallosus (Gould, 1843)
 Amphidromus atricallosus classiarius Sutcharit & Panha, 2006
 Amphidromus atricallosus leucoxanthus (von Martens, 1864)
 Amphidromus atricallosus perakensis Fulton, 1901
 Amphidromus atricallosus temasek Tan, Chan & Panha, 2011 
 Amphidromus atricallosus atricallosus -  variant form 'laidlawi''' (not a subspecies)

 Distribution 
Distribution of Amphidromus atricallosus'' and its subspecies include:
 Southern Myanmar
 Southern and eastern Thailand including Sakaeo Province, Thailand.
 Widely distributed in Peninsular Malaysia.
 Singapore

Description

References

External links 

atricallosus
Gastropods described in 1843